Duality principle or principle of duality may refer to:

 Duality (projective geometry)
 Duality (order theory)
 Duality principle (Boolean algebra)
 Duality principle for sets
 Duality principle (optimization theory)
 Lagrange duality
 Duality principle in functional analysis, used in large sieve method of analytic number theory
 Wave–particle duality

See also

 Duality (mathematics)
 Duality (disambiguation)
 Dual (disambiguation)
 List of dualities